1 bit is the smallest possible information size.

1-bit may refer to:

 1-bit computing, systems that process 1 bit per work cycle
 1-bit DAC, the oversampling digital-to-analog converter technology
 Binary image or 1-bit images, images made out of two colours